Davletovo (Däwlät) is a rural locality (a village) in Sibaysky Selsoviet, Baymaksky District, Bashkortostan, Russia. The population was 25 as of 2010. There are 7 streets.

Geography 
Davletovo is located 44 km northeast of Baymak (the district's administrative centre) by road. Arkaim is the nearest rural locality.

References 

Rural localities in Baymaksky District